Calif may refer to: 

 Caliph
 Abbreviation of California
 Calif (company), a subsidiary of French bank Société Générale